Methylopila henanensis is a Gram-negative bacterium species from the genus Methylopila with a single flagellum.

References

Further reading 
 

Methylocystaceae
Bacteria described in 2015